Billie Lorraine Hammerberg (24 March 1936 – 8 February 1995)  was an Australian actress, best known for roles on television and film.

Biography
Hammerberg was an Australian actress best known for her role in the television series Prisoner in 1985 as May Collins. She had previously appeared in the series in a guest role in 1979, playing Valerie Richardson, a jewellery store owner, who is an ex-prisoner who shelters her escapee friend and former cellmate Bea Smith (played by Val Lehman) while she is on the run.

Other TV credits include: Homicide, Bluey, Cop Shop, Carson's Law,  Special Squad" and Round the Twist" She also acted opposite Meryl Streep during a brief appearance in the film A Cry in the Dark''.

Hammerberg died of unspecified cancer in Melbourne on 8 February 1995 at the age of 58. She was cremated at Springvale Botanical Cemetery on 13 February 1995.

External links
 

Australian film actresses
Australian television actresses
1995 deaths
Deaths from cancer in Victoria (Australia)
1936 births